Liu Ning (born January 1962) is a Chinese politician, serving since October 2021 as Communist Party Secretary of Guangxi. Previously he served as Governor of Liaoning. He spent much of his career in water resources.

Career
Liu was born in Linjiang, Jilin. He joined the Communist Party in 1990, and he was graduated from Wuhan University of Hydraulic and Electric Engineering (now is a part of Wuhan University).

Liu spent much of his career in water resources. He entered to work in Yangtze River Basin Planning Office, and served as the Chief of the Hub Design Department Crossing Dam Building Design Section Project Team. Later he served as the Deputy Director, Qingjiang Engineering Design Office, Design Bureau, the Deputy Director of the Design Center of the Design Institute and Director of the Three Gorges Design Office, the Director of the Jiangyan Engineering Department, Assistant Chief Engineer, Deputy Director of the Hub Design Department, and the Deputy chief engineer of the Yangtze River Water Resources Commission. In 2000, he served as the General Manager of Hubei Changjiang Bidding Co., Ltd..

In 2001, Liu was appointed as the Chief Engineer of the Planning and Design Administration of the South–North Water Transfer Project, and he was appointed as the General Engineer of the Ministry of Water Resources, later he served as the Deputy Minister in 2009.

In 2017, Liu was appointed as the CCP Deputy Secretary of Qinghai, then he was appointed as the Secretary of the Political and Legal Committee. In August 2018, Liu was appointed as the acting Governor of Qinghai. His position was confirmed in September.

In 2020, Liu was appointed as Governor of Liaoning.

On 19 October 2021, he was transferred to southwest China's Guangxi Zhuang Autonomous Region and appointed Communist Party Secretary, the top political position in the region.

References 

People from Baishan
1962 births
Living people
Governors of Liaoning
Governors of Qinghai
Chinese Communist Party politicians from Jilin
People's Republic of China politicians from Jilin
Alternate members of the 19th Central Committee of the Chinese Communist Party
Delegates to the 13th National People's Congress